Firo  or FIRO and Firos or FIROS may refer to:

Firo or FIRO
 FIRO, post-nominal letters for a Fellow of the Institution of Railway Operators (changed to FCIRO in October 2021)
 Fundamental interpersonal relations orientation (FIRO), a theory of interpersonal relations
 Firo-canna, another name for the Japanese syllabary Hiragana
 Firo, a cryptocurrency
 Firo, a village in the Tillabéri Department in Niger.
 Firo, one of the protagonists in the video game Firo & Klawd

Firos or FIROS
 Firos (artillery), FIROS, an Italian. truck mounted, field rocket system 
 Georgios Firos also Giorgos Foiros (born 1953), Greek footballer 
 Firos Shah also Firuz Shah Tughlaq (1309-1388), sultan of Delhi